Multicinema (also known as MC) is a Mexican movie programming cable television network owned by MVS Comunicaciones. The cable network was launched along with the wireless cable television company MVS Multivision, now called MASTV in Mexico City.

References

External links
Multicinema official webpage

Television networks in Mexico
MVS Comunicaciones
Television channels and stations established in 1989